Pablo Webster (born October 2, 1979) is an American former professional soccer player.

Career
Webster was drafted in the fourth round of the 2001 MLS SuperDraft (44th overall) by Kansas City Wizards, however he did sign with the club.  He later joined Charleston Battery where he made 10 appearances in 2001.

References

1979 births
Living people
American soccer players
Clemson Tigers men's soccer players
Charleston Battery players
Association football midfielders
Soccer players from Maryland
Sporting Kansas City draft picks
A-League (1995–2004) players